JAS or Jas may refer to:

People 
 Abbreviation of James (name)
 Jas Arora, Indian model and actor
 Jas Binag, Indo-British model and actor
 Jas H. Duke (1939–1992), Australian poet
 Jas Elsner (born 1962), British art historian and classicist
 Jas Gawronski (born 1936), Italian journalist and politician
 Jas Mann (born 1971), British musician

Places 
 Jás, a village in Romania
 Jas, Loire, a commune in France
 Jinnah Antarctic Station, operated by Pakistan
 Syrian Arab Republic, Arabic transliteration of Jumhūrīyah al-ʻArabīyah as-Sūrīyah

Other uses 
 JAS, a Peruvian rock band; see Peruvian rock
 JAS 39 Gripen, a Swedish multirole combat aircraft
 JAS Motorsport
 Japan Air System, a Japanese airline
 Japanese Agricultural Standard
 Java Analysis Studio
 Jenkins activity survey
 Jericho Appreciation Society, a professional wrestling stable
 Journal of Applied Statistics, a statistics research journal
 Judge–advisor system
 New Caledonian Javanese language, ISO 639-3 code
 Industrigruppen JAS, a Swedish industrial consortium

See also
Jace, given name
Jayce, given name